Orangefield Old Boys is a Northern Irish, intermediate football club playing in Division 1A of the Northern Amateur Football League. The club is based in Belfast, and was formed in 1966 by members of the Orangefield Old Boys' Association, made up of former pupils of Orangefield High School. It shares a ground with Cregagh Cricket Club. The club plays in the Irish CupThe 2021/22 top goal scorer was Owen Getty.

References

External links
  Club website]

Association football clubs in Northern Ireland
Association football clubs established in 1966
Association football clubs in Belfast
Northern Amateur Football League clubs
1966 establishments in Northern Ireland